FAME (Forecasting Analysis and Modeling Environment) is a time series database released in 1981 and owned by FIS Global.

History 
The FAME software environment had several development phases during its history.

Lawrence C. Rafsky founded GemNet Software Corp to create FAME in 1981. It was an independent software company located in Ann Arbor, Michigan.  The first version of the software was delivered to Harris Bank in 1983. The company was purchased by CitiCorp in 1984. During this time, development focused on the time series-oriented database engine and the 4GL scripting language.

Citigroup sold FAME to private investors headed by Warburg Pincus in 1994. Management focused on fixing bugs, developing remote database server access to FAME, and investing in expanding the FAME database engine. Emphasis was also placed on extending FAME by creating an object-oriented Java interface called TimeIQ that replicated many features of FAME 4GL in Java. This period also saw the release of the access point, which provides URL access to FAME objects in multiple output formats.

SunGard acquired FAME in 2004.

In 2010, Sungard merged FAME and MarketMap Data into the MarketMap brand.

FIS Global acquired Sungard in 2015.

Toolkits and connectors 
FAME Desktop Add-in for Excel:
FAME Desktop is an Excel add-in that supports the =FMD(expression, sd, ed,0, freq, orientation) and =FMS(expression, freq + date) formula, just as the 4GL command prompt does.  These formulas can be placed in Excel spreadsheets and are linked to FAME objects and analytics stored on a FAME server. Sample excel templates for research and analytics, which act as accelerators for clients, are available in the template library.
The FAME Desktop Add-in was first renamed as FAME Populator, then MarketMap Analytics.

FAME Connector for MATLAB:
Matlab is an environment for technical computing applications that is also used in the financial sector by fixed-income analysts, equity research groups, and investment firms. Customers can store content in FAME and use Matlab to access and model their data. The Matlab-FAME Connector uses the FAME Java Toolkit to link Matlab scripts to FAME objects.

BITA Curve Connector:
The BITA Curve workstation provides a platform that can link to “in database” analytics and content warehoused in FAME. Through the BITA Curve Connector, FAME users can better visualize and work with the content that they warehouse into FAME.

R Interface:
FAME customers have developed and released as free software an interface that links FAME objects to the open-source R statistical package. Originally developed at the Federal Reserve Board, features include:
 Time series adaptation of FAME to R
 Frequency conformance
 A set of fundamental statistical functions

SASEFAME:
SAS provides an interface to FAME databases called SASEFAME. This provides dynamic read-and-write access between a SAS application and FAME databases or a FAME server process

TROLL Interface:
TROLL’s interface to FAME provides read and write access from a TROLL application to a FAME Server or directly to a local FAME database

Development timeline 
1982–1994:
GemNet introduced the first release of FAME in 1983. Citicorp purchased the company in 1984.
Development milestones during this period:
 1990: First FAME Remote Database Server (FRDB) – master/back – released
 1991: Data distribution services launched
 1993: Multiple Client Analytical Database Server (MCADBS) released with FAME 7.5
Before MCADBS, users could not use a thin C HLI client to leverage the power of 4GL on a remote host via client/server TCP. The 7.5 release also introduced some important 4GL features, including PostScript Reports, and database features such as global names and formulas.
 1994: FAME 7.6 made graphical and reporting enhancements as well as performance improvements.
 The Mid-1990s: Standard & Poor’s, Thomson Financial, DRI, and FT Interactive Data product loaders created

1994–2004:
During this period, the focus was on improving managed content delivery to onsite FAME warehouses and hosted ASP FAME servers. Milestones included:
 1997: MSCI and Russell product loaders added
 1998: FAME 8.0 with FRDB write server released
 FAME Populator 4.0 released
 TimeIQ (now known as FAME Java Toolkit) beta 1 was released. FAME created an object-oriented Java programming interface.
 2001: FAME 9.0 increased the FAME database size limit from 2GB to 64 GB.
 2002: FAME 9.0 for Windows released
 2003: FAME 9.0 ported to Linux
 2004: access Point (now known as FAME Web Access) with connection pooling released

2004–present:
After being acquired by SunGard, FAME’s development focus shifted to the 4GL scripting language and core FAME features. Milestones included:
 2004: access Point 1.5 released
 August 2005: Enterprise FAME Java Toolkit 2.2 released
 December 2005: reference Point launched
 March 2006: Support for 64-bit Linux and UNIX introduced in FAME 9.2
FAME 9.2 also added new 4GL debugging features, analytical functions, graphics, and reporting improvements. Other core 4GL features included the MOVE function and new forms of the SHIFT and FILESPEC functions. The FAME SEARCH command was enhanced with the PATH option. Memory support mapped FAME databases and the TUNE CACHE MEGABYTES option helped users to better manage large volume warehouses.

 2007: Pathfinder Global Formula run-time beta tested
 June–September 2007: FAME 9.3 added new debugging features, including the DEBUG option and BREAK, STEP, and CONTINUE commands.
FAME 9.3 also introduced new graphical features, including BUBBLE charts.
 February 2008: Access Point 1.7 with Web Services released
 May 2008: Site Server on Linux released
 October 2008: FAME .NET Toolkit released
 February 2009: FAME 10.0 released.

FAME 10 opens up the environment to real-time analysis with larger database storage,
as well as support for new frequencies, such as millisecond and weekly patterns.
New database formats increase the maximum size to 256 GB.

During this period FAME has also focused on expanding the managed content delivered to the database, as well as out-of-the-box object models that warehouse builders can leverage when loading proprietary content.

 Expanded managed content provides out-of-the-box data and object models for:
 Equity pricing
 Corporate bond pricing
 Futures, commodities, and options
 Company and index fundamentals
 Company and index estimates
 Macro-economic indicators and benchmark construction
 FAME 10 provides several enhanced features for creating object models, including
 Support for longer object names (up to 242 characters) and for assigning an unlimited number of user-defined attributes to an object
 Support for object names with up to 35 dimensions
 December 2010: FAME 10.1 released.
 December 2011: FAME 10.2 released.
 March 2012: FAME 11.0 released.
 June 2012: FAME 11.1 released.
 December 2012: FAME 11.2 released.
 March 2013: FAME 11.3 released.
 June 2014: FAME 11.4 released.
 November 2015: FAME 11.5 released.

See also 
 Time series database

References

External links
 Sungard FAME site 
 Sybase Fame Relational Gateway Technical Overview

Time series software